The Make-Up Artists and Hair Stylists Guild Award for Best Special Make-Up Effects in a Feature-Length Motion Picture is one of the awards given annually to people working in the motion picture industry by the Make-Up Artists and Hair Stylists Guild (MUAHS). It is presented to makeup artists who work in Special Effects makeup, or "Prosthetic makeup", whose work has been deemed "best" in a given year. The award was first given in 2000, during the first annual awards, and was given when the awards were brought back in 2014.

Winners and nominees
 "†" indicates Academy Award for Best Makeup and Hairstyling
 "‡" indicates Academy Award nomination for Best Makeup and Hairstyling

1990s

2000s

2010s

2020s

References

Special Make-Up Effects in a Feature-Length Motion Picture
Awards established in 2019